Yazmín de los Ángeles Copete Zapot (born 5 August 1964) is a Mexican politician affiliated with the PRD. She served as Deputy of the LXII Legislature of the Mexican Congress representing Veracruz, as well as a local deputy in the LIX Legislature of the Congress of Veracruz.

References

 "Perfil del legislador" como ex diputada Local (2016-2018)

1964 births
Living people
Politicians from Veracruz
Women members of the Chamber of Deputies (Mexico)
Party of the Democratic Revolution politicians
21st-century Mexican politicians
21st-century Mexican women politicians
People from Santiago Tuxtla
Universidad Veracruzana alumni
Members of the Congress of Veracruz
Deputies of the LXII Legislature of Mexico
Members of the Chamber of Deputies (Mexico) for Veracruz